Federal Highway 98 (Carretera Federal 98) is a Federal Highway of Mexico. The highway travels from Minatitlán, Colima in the northeast to Pez Vela Junction, Colima to the southwest. From Minatitlán, the highway continues on as a Colima state route to Colima City.

References

098
Transportation in Colima